"I Will Survive" is a song first performed by Gloria Gaynor.

I Will Survive may also refer to:

 I Will Survive (TV series), a 2012 Australian talent show
 I Will Survive (book), a 2009 memoir by Sunil Robert
 I Will Survive, also known as Sobreviviré, a 1999 Spanish film
 I Will Survive (film), a 1993 South Korean historical drama film
 I Will Survive (Billie Jo Spears album), a 1979 album by Billie Jo Spears
 I Will Survive (Gloria Gaynor album)
 "I Will Survive", a 1970 song by Liverpool band Arrival
 "I Will Survive", a song by Cheap Trick from the soundtrack to the 1992 film Gladiator